The Next Step is a Canadian teen drama series created by Frank Van Keeken. The series was shot in a mockumentary style influenced by reality television, following the members of a troupe from the titular dance studio, as they train for and compete in various championships, and deal with rivalries with other dance schools and drama among the characters at the studio itself. It ran for eight seasons consisting of 233 episodes, airing the first six seasons from March 8, 2013 to April 7, 2019 on Family Channel, and airing its seventh season from April 10, 2020 to September 18, 2020 on CBC Gem.

Main characters

Overview of main cast
  = Main cast (credited) 
  = Recurring cast (4+ episodes)
  = Guest cast (1–3 episodes)

 Notes

Emily
Emily (portrayed by Alexandra Beaton) is a contemporary dancer, and is A-Troupe's dance captain at the series' beginning. Beaton has stated that "her character is much more confrontational than she would ever be, and a bit of a ‘mean girl’." Beaton was also the only member of the original series cast with "extensive acting experience".

Emily is Riley's overprotective older sister. At the beginning of season 1, she is the controlling dance captain of A-Troupe, and head of the E-Girls clique. Emily is threatened by the arrival of Michelle, a new dancer that makes it onto A-Troupe. As dance captain, Emily never includes people's ideas, which is later revealed to be due to her own insecurities as a dancer. Riley's and Michelle's plan to replace Emily with Michelle as dance captain comes out in the open in "Sabotage", and Emily is crushed after she is voted out as dance captain, feeling betrayed by all of A-Troupe, and signaling the end of the E-Girls. After Michelle places Emily in the back row for the regionals finals routine, Emily leaves The Next Step to audition to join Elite Dance Academy. After realising that she is not valued by Lucien and Amanda at Elite, and that they are just using her to sabotage The Next Step, Emily returns to The Next Step in "Come Back... Be Here". Recognizing that Emily has leadership qualities that she lacks, Michelle asks Emily to be co-dance captain, which Emily accepts in "Price Tag". In "Winner Takes All", Emily confronts Eldon, and Eldon confesses to wanting to be with Michelle, which enrages Emily. The Next Step win regionals, but Emily is back to despising Michelle.

In season 2, Emily ends up developing romantic feelings for new A-Trouper, Hunter. In "The Final Cut", Emily coldly advocates for cutting Stephanie and Tiffany from A-Troupe, destroying their friendships. While at the mall, Emily accidentally overhears Amanda's and Lucien's plan to destroy The Next Step's chances at nationals in "Game On". Emily and Riley devise a plan to stop Amanda, with Emily acting as a double-agent against Amanda. The plan succeeds, but Amanda forces Emily to break up with Hunter in "Heartbreaker". Realising that Emily is a double-agent, Amanda frames Emily for stealing in "Under Pressure", until Amanda's plan is exposed in "Just Dance". At nationals, Emily competes as part of the team in the semi-final round, but severely injures her knee at the very conclusion of the routine, precluding her from performing in the finals routine. The Next Step, with Amanda performing in Emily's place, wins nationals. 

At the start of season 3, Emily is still recuperating from her knee injury, but plans to audition for the internationals team. In "Secrets", Emily confesses to Stephanie that the doctors have not cleared her to dance. Stephanie and Riley expose this to Kate, who removes Emily from the team, ending Emily's competitive dance career, and leaving Emily heartbroken. In "The Times They Are a Changin'", Emily gives the treasured dance captain diary to Richelle, before leaving The Next Step for the final time. Emily returns from college in season 4 to help Riley, at Michelle's invitation, in "A Fool in Love", after things spin out of Riley's control. Emily demands the power to make some "hard decisions" if she is to help, which includes removing Piper from the duet with Alfie after determining Piper was the problem. Emily also convinces James to perform the duet with Alfie, which leads to The Next Step winning the qualifier and advancing to regionals.

Emily is named studio head by Miss Kate in season 5, replacing Riley. Emily's ruthlessness during A-Troupe auditions in "A New Regime" results in her being challenged by Michelle who forms a rival competition team from many of the dancers that Emily cut – leading to the battle between Emily's TNS East and Michelle's TNS West for the right to compete in regionals. Emily's and Michelle's rivalry with the two teams gets so out of control that Miss Kate bans either team from competing in "TNS: Civil War". Piper and Amy conspire behind Emily's and Michelle's backs to unite the two teams, which forces Emily and Michelle to work together as co-studio heads. In "Pointe of No Return", Emily goes into denial about Richelle's injury, and orders A-Troupe to film the qualifiers video as planned. When Richelle goes to the hospital, Miss Kate fires Emily and Michelle as studio heads for their irresponsibility in endangering one of their dancer's health, though only Emily knew of the injury.

In season 6, Emily and Michelle are reduced to working in Shakes & Ladders, but are rehired after Miss Angela's scheme is exposed to Miss Kate. Emily rents studio space to Thalia's AcroNation, but then ejects them with Miss Kate's blessing when they qualify for regionals. In "A-Troupe Escape", Emily and Michelle discover that Kate is selling the studio, but a hopeful Emily resolves to buy the studio from Kate. In "And Then There Were Three", Emily is able to talk a panicking Piper into performing in the regionals semi-finals. In season 7, it is revealed that Michelle declined to buy the studio with Emily, as Michelle wants to pursue a professional dance career. Emily remains studio head under the ownership of Nick. In "Just Duet", Michelle wants Emily to manage her dance tour, as Emily has good business sense. Emily is torn on what to do, as accepting this offer would mean leaving The Next Step. In "It All Comes Down to This", Emily decides to accept Michelle's offer over Nick's, and immediately leaves after A-Troupe perform their finals routine on Dancemania, but does so without saying goodbye.

Michelle
Michelle (portrayed by Victoria Baldesarra) is a new contemporary dancer who moved to Toronto, Ontario from Madison, Wisconsin.

She is a previous Miss Nationals soloist who Emily is jealous of. Michelle quickly becomes enemies with Emily and the E-Girls. When her old love interest Hunter arrives from Madison, she is embroiled in a relationship drama with Eldon, Hunter and Emily, causing her to leave the studio. She later returns after James persuades her to with a flash mob. Michelle is made an alternate in season 3 after struggling with her parents divorce. In season 4, she was determined to be the best dancer she could and strived in every possible way to achieve this. Michelle's determinations prove to be too much at regionals, when she faints during her trio with Amy and Amanda and ends up going to the hospital. Michelle recovers and is cleared to dance in the finals of regionals, however, she ends up taking Amanda's spot in the dance, much to Amanda's frustration. In season 5, after TNS loses Regionals, Emily becomes studio head but Michelle is unhappy with the formers regime and decides to form her own troupe, though the two later reunite. She is later fired from her studio head position alongside Emily, but is later reinstated and helps A-Troupe win Regionals. In season 7, Michelle decides to leave her position as studio head at The Next Step after being there the longest from all of her teammates to become a professional dancer. Michelle then returns shortly after she leaves, to ask for a favour from Emily. Michelle asks for Emily's help in deciding whether or not her offer to go on tour is worth it or not. Emily ends up fixing her dilemmas, and this gives Michelle an idea. Michelle offers Emily an offer to go on tour with her, and asks if she could handle the business side of things. This way, Michelle can focus on her dancing. Michelle gives Emily some time to think about it, and eventually, Emily accepts Michelle's offer. Though once enemies, Michelle and Emily become business partners for their ongoing tour.

James 
James (portrayed by Trevor Tordjman) is an easy-going breakdancer who struggles in math. 

James is the overprotective older brother of Piper and Deborah's only son. He has dated Amanda and Beth, but feels differently about Riley and begins to fall in love with her and starts to date her in later in season 1. When dancing is starting to affect his school work, his mother pulls him from the studio until he gets his grades up. Riley offers him a proposition that if he gets 70% or above on his maths test, she will go on a date with him. When he returns, he gets offered Daniel's solo after he gets injured but he turns it down. James continues his relationship with Riley in season 2, but she breaks up with him when she finds him kissing his ex-girlfriend, Beth, during their duet rehearsal, resulting in them giving up their Nationals duet and James and Beth getting together. He then breaks up with Beth because he still has feelings for Riley. Riley creates a list of tasks for James to complete before she would get back together with him. Later when Michelle returns to the studio, Riley and James get back together and get their Nationals duet back from Giselle and Thalia. He makes the Internationals team in season 3, and his relationship with Riley is going smoothly until the British transfer Ella starts to get involved. He does his last dance at the International tie-breaker in the finals with Riley as he decides to leave The Next Step to permanently playing the drums in his band, who he began to work with at the start of season 3. In season 4, he competes with Eldon and West at the Bangers and Mashups International Hip-Hop Extravaganza. He is unaware of the kiss between Riley and Alfie and James becomes worried and confused when Riley is starting to ignore his calls. James comes back in the middle of his competition to find out that Riley cheated on him with Alfie through his sister (Piper). He forgives Riley after remembering that he kissed Beth early on in their relationship, and Riley forgave him for that. Riley later breaks up with James after advice from Emily, but then he reconciles with her when she spontaneously arrives in London He later forgives Riley and their relationship goes back to normal. In season 1 and 2 he has short hair. In season 3, he grows his hair longer. In season 5, he returns for the danceathon held by TNS West. He also is a judge alongside Riley and Ms. Kate in the dance battle between TNS East and TNS West. James also returns in the Christmas Special of The Next Step that celebrates the 30th anniversary of the studio. In Piper's alternate reality James is The Next Step's janitor, ironically suffers from anxiety and is no longer dating Riley. Thanks to Piper's successful efforts in reminding everyone that they love to dance, in an alternate reality, James and Riley get back together.

Riley
Riley (portrayed by Brittany Raymond) is a shy contemporary and ballet dancer who is Emily's younger sister. 

In season 1, she is a member of the E-Girls but gets kicked out by her sister when she stands up to Emily in favor of Michelle. Riley seems to have a crush on James in season 1, then starts to date James in season 1.5, but later breaks up with him in season 2, after seeing him and his ex-girlfriend Beth kiss during their duet rehearsal. In season 2.5, Riley makes a list of 20 tasks for James to complete before she would get back together with him. Riley and James get back together and perform a duet at Nationals. In season 3, she makes the Internationals team and befriends the mischievous English transfer Ella, who starts to change Riley and strain her relationship with James. Ella is Riley's best friend all the way up until Internationals. At Internationals, Ella steals Riley's solo in the Female solo round, which makes Riley feel betrayed, causing her to not want to be friends with Ella anymore. In the semifinals, the studio will have to face England, Ella's team, who already cheated The Next Step once already. The Next Step wins the semifinals and Ella asks Riley if they can be friends again, but Riley refuses. In season 1, she has medium-length brown hair and brown eyes. In season 2, her hair is cut into a bob. In season 3, she grows her hair longer. She wears braces for the first 2 seasons and gets them removed in season 3. In season 4, she becomes Studio Head when Kate steps down in order to take a position as a judge in a dance competition in England. She grows closer to Alfie, a new A-Trouper who attended Internationals. Riley develops intensifying romantic feelings for Alfie, which he reciprocates. Despite these feelings, Riley refuses to act on them until she kisses Alfie. She is filled with guilt and paranoia, but refuses to tell James what happens. Riley is shocked and apprehensive when Piper tells her that she witnessed the kiss, and gives Riley an ultimatum to tell James. After the Regionals loss, Riley decides to leave The Next Step and go to business school. Riley then returns in the Christmas Special of The Next Step which celebrates the 30 year anniversary of the studio. In Piper's alternate reality, Riley is dating Alfie although she still harbors feelings for James. Thanks to Piper's successful efforts in reminding everyone that they love to dance, in an alternate reality, Riley and James get back together.

Tiffany 
Tiffany (portrayed by Tamina Pollack-Paris) is a bubbly hip hop dancer and member of E-Girls. She is shown to love gossip. In the season 1's mid-season finale, when everyone is forced to choose who they want as Dance Captain, Tiffany sides with Michelle to cover herself, shocking Emily and Stephanie, earning Stephanie's antipathy and resulting in the end of the E-Girls clique, while at the same time gaining her respect with the rest of A-Troupe. In season 2, Tiffany objects to doing the Challenge as she does not believe the team should be changed from the dancers who won regionals. She is cut from A-Troupe, alongside Stephanie, after the A-Troupe auditions, as she struggles with the fouette section of Phoebe's routine. Tiffany then wonders whether she even belongs at the Next Step anymore if they are willing to cut her from A-Troupe so easily. Her final appearance as part of The Next Step is when James arranges the mall dance for Michelle to convince Michelle to return to The Next Step. Tiffany is not seen in season 3. In season 4, Tiffany is revealed to be the manager of the auditions for the dancing tour company that Giselle and Amanda audition for. In season 5, Emily is shown to be calling Tiffany, to scout for new dancers, implying that Tiffany is now is a studio head at another dance studio.

Giselle
Giselle (portrayed by Jordan Clark) is a sweet acro dancer who is Daniel's best friend. At the beginning of the first season, Giselle is demoted from A-Troupe to B-Troupe, which gets her kicked out of the E-Girls clique for no longer being in A-Troupe. She and Daniel grew up together, which was partially why Giselle was so devastated about not getting back into A-Troupe was because she felt like she let Daniel down. When Emily and Stephanie leave The Next Step for Elite, A-Troupe has B-Troupe audition to be their replacements, and Giselle is promoted back into A-Troupe, to replace Emily, her former friend. Giselle makes it to the nationals with the team in season 2. Giselle becomes dance captain in season 3, after fending off a challenge from former Elite assistant captain Shanel who leaves The Next Step after losing the promotion to captain to Giselle. She is forced to sub in for Riley in the female solos round at internationals, after Ella steals Riley's routine. Near the beginning of season 4, Giselle leaves The Next Step to become a professional dancer in a touring dance company. In season 6, Giselle is Chuck Anderson's co-host and dance commentary expert for the SNR Network at the 19th annual regionals championships, where is it revealed that Giselle's last name is Bellamy.

Fairy 
Fairy is Giselle's alter-ego, also portrayed by Jordan Clark, appearing in the Christmas special as a fairy in Piper's alternate world. She shows Piper she does belong in the next step and what the next step life would be like if she wasn’t.

Chloe 
Chloe (portrayed by Jennifer Pappas) is a shy ballet dancer whose parents cannot afford her dancing at the studio. She has to work a part-time job as a waitress while being a member of A-Troupe as well as an E-girl. As season 1 progresses, she becomes less and less of an E-girl until things eventually boil over and she secretly joins Michelle's group until Stephanie catches the group rehearsing and sees Chloe with them. In the season 1 finale she sides with Michelle, and seems to show no remorse for it. In season 1.5, everyone finds out about her job and give her huge tips to pay for A-Troupe. In season 2, Kate gives Chloe a job at The Next Step to teach dance to little kids (even though Chloe is afraid of kids). One of those kids named Margie became Chloe's guardian angel. when Chloe had a problem Margie was there for her and finally in season 3 when Chloe gets offered a position in The Nutcracker and cannot decide if she will compete in internationals or act in the nutcracker, and West convinced Chloe to take the role (because Margie told him to) and after she told Kate, Margie came to the room with Chloe and danced with her one last time Chloe found out that Margie was an angel literally after she disappeared. Chloe returned after 3 years in season 6 with her assistant Oliver, as a choreographer for the pas de deux at regionals featuring Richelle and Noah. After seeing his talent, Chloe offers Noah an audition in the Robin hood the musical. Richelle then questions Chloe in which why she was not awarded with a similar opportunity and Chloe's response was then due to Richelle not conveying feeling and showing feeling's through her dancing including Richelle's use of Lyrical eyebrows. Chloe then returns in the Christmas Special of The Next Step.

Eldon 
Eldon (portrayed by Isaac Lupien) is a contemporary dancer who had been obsessed with fellow dancer Emily for years. 

In season 1, he continues to show Emily his affection by constantly  asking her out, much to Emily's disgust. After Eldon proclaims his feelings for Emily and she embarrasses him, Eldon decides to move on from Emily and forget about her. He and Emily grow closer after learning her secret about performing difficult choreography. Eldon comforts Emily after being put in the back row by Michelle and they kiss, thus commencing a relationship, albeit short-lived. Whilst Emily is at Elite Dance Academy, Eldon develops requited romantic feelings for Michelle and promises to break up with Emily to be with Michelle. At the beginning of season 2, he has a good, solid relationship with Michelle until her former crush, Hunter, arrives the studio. Eldon is challenged to a dance battle by Hunter, with the winner receiving Michelle as their prize. Eldon loses to Hunter, so he backs off of Michelle and later breaks up with her in season 2. The dance battle is secretly filmed by Amanda and shown to Kate by Michelle and this makes Hunter the new Nationals soloist. Later in the season, Hunter wants to be friends with Eldon and Eldon tells him that they have to dance battle again for the solo and Eldon his solo back. In season 3, he and fellow dancer Thalia start to fall for each other. James tells Eldon that when he can do 30 pirouettes, he will be ready to date Thalia. In the turning contest at Internationals, James abandons the 30-pirouette rule and tells Eldon that if he wins the round, he can date Thalia. Eldon wins the round by spinning the longest and wins Thalia. The two then kiss when The Next Step wins the mystery song round of the competition due to Eldon's win in the spinning contest. In season 4, Eldon has light blonde hair and blue eyes, and pale skin. Eldon leaves the Next Step at the beginning of season 4 and competes with West and James at the Bangers and Mash-Ups International Hip-Hop Extravaganza competition, which they win. He also makes a guest appearance in season 5 where he agrees to choreograph a Regionals routine for both Emily's studio - TNS East and Michelle's studio - TNS West. In season 6, he is head choreographer of his girlfriend Thalia's dance team called 'Acronation'. He also gains the nickname 'Electric Eldon' as a DJ for the prom in season 6. Eldon then returns in the Christmas Special of The Next Step that celebrates the 30 year anniversary of the studio. In season 7, Eldon is called by Emily to choreograph Lily and Kingston's Nationals duet. He agrees to work on it and helps Lily and Kingston work through their constant arguments and together they end up creating a successful duet.

Stephanie 
Stephanie (portrayed by Samantha Grecchi) is a bossy jazz dancer and Emily's best friend. Her parents are not very supportive of her dancing career and she relies on Emily for encouragement. Due to her parents' absence, Stephanie also relies on Kate for advice and sees her as a "mother figure". She is the main saboteur of season 1, committing almost all the sneaky acts to defend Emily as dance captain. She is also the only member of A-Troupe who constantly sticks by Emily. During season 1 Stephanie and Emily tryout for Elite but Stephanie does not make it. She then auditions for a role on a TV show and gets it. However, she ends up turning it down after realizing it was being filmed the same week as Regionals. At the start of season 2, she chooses to attend acting classes which cause her to be late to the choreographed audition for the Nationals team and fail the audition routine. She antagonises Emily for not vouching for her. After the auditions for Nationals, Stephanie is cut from A-Troupe along with Tiffany and she decides to join B Troupe. Stephanie aspires to pursue a career in the performing arts and dreams of being a triple threat (excelling in acting, singing, and dancing). Stephanie can be seen singing in the song "Play the Game" for The Next Step. Stephanie's inspirations include Ariana Grande and Beyonce, similar to Tiffany.  Later, in season 3 when Chloe leaves The Next Step to join a ballet touring company, Stephanie wins her place back in A-Troupe and on the internationals team. In season 4, Stephanie leaves The Next Step in order to go to Los Angeles to pursue her career. Stephanie then returns in the Christmas Special of The Next Step celebrating the 30 year anniversary of the studio.

West 
West (portrayed by Lamar Johnson) is a friendly hip hop dancer, he is smart at some times but says it in a silly way, he can be really funny at times. He hates drama, and while he does not always share his opinion, when he does most people are often confused by it. He rarely makes sense, but uses this to his advantage in multiple instances to get out of sticky situations. It was revealed that he used to be in a street dance group, Seeds, who gave him the nickname 'Compass', in "Dancing in the Street". He makes it to the Nationals team in season 2. At the end of season 2 he kisses Emily but later becomes 'just friends' with her. In season 3, West gets onto the internationals team and is challenged by Eldon to audition for a ballet company and asks Chloe for help. He does not get in but she does, causing her to leave The Next Step. At Internationals, before the semi-finals round, West gets food poisoning, thought to be from a kebab. He is unable to dance in the semi-finals and Michelle takes up his spot, as she and Amanda agreed to take the spots of people that they had chosen, and Michelle took West as one of hers. However West does dance in the semi finals and afterwards there is no signs of him being ill. He leaves the Next Step at the beginning of season 4 because he wants to travel the world and does not want to wait for the next internationals to do so. He competes with Eldon and James at the Bangers and Mash-Ups International Hip-Hop Extravaganza competition, which they win. In season 5, Michelle picks him to become the head choreographer of TNS West. After season 5, he leaves to explore the world. He then returns in the Christmas Special of The Next Step that celebrates the 30 year anniversary of the studio.

Alien 
Alien is West's alter-ego, also portrayed by Lamar Johnson, appearing in the Halloween mini special as an alien.

Daniel 
Daniel (portrayed by Brennan Clost) is a ballet and contemporary dancer. He is determined, ambitious and is very focussed on what is best for his career. 

In season 1.5, he injures his ankle landing a jump. Later in the season, he fractures it when doing a lift with his ex-best friend, Giselle. He is then unable to participate in regionals and leaves the studio for a while. He returns in season 2 with his ankle healed. When he does not get the male solo, he threatens to leave the studio and join Chris's studio, Superstar Dance. He leaves the Next Step after Kate refuses to give him the solo. He later competes against Eldon in the male solo round at Nationals, and loses. He gets offered an audition for Juilliard, but it does not go well for him. He returns in season 3 as a member of Elite Dance Studio to compete for a spot on the Internationals team. He loses his spot to Giselle. During internationals, Daniel discovers that Lucien is a judge. Wanting to save The Next Step from Lucien, he sends an email with a video attachment to Giselle. The video shows Lucien plotting to take down The Next Step in front of Tess and Daniel. Giselle shows this to Miss Kate, who then shows it to the woman in charge of Internationals. She gets two policemen to take Lucien out after showing the video to the man who owns the studio of the Swedish team. Daniel was denied the chance to return to The Next Step. After realizing how poorly he treated his friends, Daniel leaves The Next Step for good. He has brown hair, chocolate brown eyes and tanned skin. However, in season 4, he leads the auditions for A-Troupe, as if it was not for him, The Next Step would not have been able to dance in the finals of Internationals. In season 5, Emily picks him to be the head choreographer for A-Troupe which later becomes TNS East. After season 5, he is not seen or referred to again.

Chris  
Chris (portrayed by Shamier Anderson) is the former head choreographer at the Next Step. He is known for his 'Dolphin Tail' tactic, used to make the A-Troupe dancers pay attention. The sort of 'father figure' to the dancers, especially James, acting as a compassionate, helpful, and rarely serious male advisor. Chris claims to be a math whiz and tutors James when his mom threatens to pull him out of the studio due to his bad grades. He leaves The Next Step at the start of the second season to become co-owner of a rival studio, Superstar Dance.

Kate 
Kate (portrayed by Bree Wasylenko) is the former owner of The Next Step studio and Phoebe's sister. Elite Dance Studio owner Lucien is often seen always plotting against and teasing Kate, Phoebe and the A-troupe dancers. She is known to all as "Miss Kate". The sort of 'mother figure' to the dancers, especially Stephanie, as she does not have one, acting as the enthusiastic female advisor though she can be strict when she needs to be. Kate eventually leaves The Next Step as she is offered a job as a judge for a dance competition in the UK, due to The Next Step's success at Internationals and gives her position as studio head to Riley. In season 5, She fires Michelle and Emily as studio heads due to them allowing Richelle to dance with an injury. Kate returns in season 6 for a meeting and lunch with Ms Angela in order for her to sign over the studio to Ms Angela to become a full partner following her 30-day probation period. However once seen what Ms Angela would like to do with the studio, She decides to fire her after having a heated argument in the office. Ms Angela leaves the Next step furious and raged which makes her throw cake at Ms Kate's face. Following these events she reinstates Michelle and Emily as Studio heads with one condition: They win Regionals. Later on in season 6, Kate is contemplating on selling the studio to another judge on her reality TV show due to her having no time to properly look after the studio. We then learn that Prior to season 7, Ms. Kate has sold The Next Step to Nick. Ms Kate then returns in the Christmas Special of The Next Step which celebrates the 30 year anniversary of the studio. She is overjoyed to see all the A-Troupe alumni return.

Amanda 
Amanda (portrayed by Logan Fabbro) is a contemporary dancer. In season 1, Amanda is Dance Captain of Elite Dance Academy, The Next Step's rival studio. She has been referred to as "Elite's own Emily", referring to Emily's rude nature before. In season 1, after Emily joined Elite, Amanda was seen giving Emily a hard time. It is later revealed that Amanda and Lucien were just using Emily, stringing Emily along in an attempt to sabotage The Next Step's chances at regionals. In season 2, Amanda informs The Next Step about "The Challenge", and is permitted to audition for The Challenge, despite Emily's protestations that Amanda cannot be trusted. In "The Final Cut", Amanda, along with as Thalia and Hunter, join A-Troupe as part of The Challenge. In "The Girl Is Mine", Amanda secretly records Hunter's and Eldon's dance battle on her smart phone. In "The Truth Comes Out", Amanda allows Michelle to discover the dance battle video, in order to sow discord in the team. Amanda confess that she is still with Elite and her intention in joining A-Troupe is to stop them from reaching nationals. Emily discovers that Amanda is still with Elite when she comes across Amanda meeting with Lucien at the mall, and plots with Riley to expose Amanda. Emily pretends to want to join Amanda in taking down The Next Step, but Amanda is suspicious, and will only Emily let join her if Emily breaks up with Hunter as a show of loyalty. Amanda soon discovers that Emily is a spy, and frames Emily for stealing to Miss Kate. Riley and Chloe expose Amanda's lies, and Amanda leaves The Next Step and returns to Elite, thinking she has successfully sabotaged The Next Step at nationals. However Amanda reconciles with the Next Step when she replaces Emily in The Next Step's nationals final dance number, as the team's registered alternate, after Emily is injured. 

Amanda truly joins The Next Step in season 3, proving her loyalty to Michelle when she turns down entreaties from Tess and Shantel to rejoin Elite. In the dance battle for the merging of the teams for internationals, Amanda defeats her former assistant captain Tess for a spot on the internationals team. Amanda later finds herself falling behind the other dancers at The Next Step for internationals, and is not a featured dancer. In "The New Girl in Town", Miss Kate sends Amanda to Sweden as part of the internationals exchange programme, and Kate reveals that Amanda will an alternate for the internationals team. When Amanda returns from her trip to Sweden, A-Troupe throws her a surprise party, and she finds out that a lot things happened while she was away, including Michelle being named the other team alternate. At the party, Amanda informs Michelle that Sweden are amazing and will be unbeatable. Neither Michelle nor Amanda ultimately perform onstage for The Next Step's win at internationals.

In season 4, Amanda is unsure whether The Next Step is still the right place for her. She ends up missing her A-Troupe audition, choosing instead to audition for a world dance tour with Giselle – Giselle is chosen, but Amanda is not. Miss Kate then refuses to allow Amanda to re-audition for A-Troupe with the second audition group, demoting her to B-Troupe over Michelle's protestations. When Riley becomes studio head, she names Amanda as her replacement on A-Troupe, over Miss Kate's objections. Amanda begins crushing on Noah in "London Calling", and they soon start dating. Amanda is named to the regionals trio by Riley, along with Michelle and Amy. In "The Edge of Glory", Giselle arrives and tells Amanda that she is welcome to join her on the world dance tour but that they will need to leave just before the regional final. Amanda eventually decides to stay with A-Troupe. However, before the finals dance at Regionals, Alfie has returned to the team, and Michelle returns from the hospital demanding to perform, and Riley removes Amanda from the finals lineup. Amanda is devastated by the perceived betrayal, and runs from backstage, refusing to watch the finale routine even for Noah. After the regionals final, Noah confesses that he cannot reach Amanda on the phone. At the beginning of season 5, Noah reveals that he and Amanda broke up. It is revealed by Riley in The Next Step: Off Season episode "Clean Start" that Amanda went on tour with Giselle in England.

Amanda is featured in The Next Step Christmas Special, which celebrates the 30 year anniversary of the studio. In Piper's alternate reality, Amanda is part of Alfie's plan to buy The Next Step dance studio as a real estate agent.

Phoebe 
Phoebe (portrayed by Natalie Krill) is a yoga instructor and Kate's sister. She is the complete opposite of Kate, being more fun, but can get angry when people do not listen to her when she is talking. Phoebe is often seen as being not that bright, but she is an amazing dancer and choreographer. After Chris leaves for his new job, Kate calls Phoebe to take his position. When the dancers first meet her she appears rather strange and odd. Phoebe leaves The Next Step in season 4 to swim with the turtles in the Galapagos Islands, and later receives a call from Noah asking for help to clear the studio of "negative energy".

Hunter 
Hunter (portrayed by Zac Vran) is Michelle's old love interest from Madison, Wisconsin. In the season 2 one-hour special, Michelle tells him that she has moved on and leaves Hunter heartbroken. Hunter and Emily devise a deceptive plan, to get their respective partners back. For the first phase of the plan, Hunter challenges Eldon to a dance battle, with the winner receiving Michelle as their prize. Hunter succeeds, meaning Eldon has to break up with Michelle. However, it is discovered that Amanda secretly filmed the dance battle and Amanda shows the video to Michelle who then shows it to Kate. The team vote between Hunter and Eldon, but Michelle decides to vote for Hunter at the last second for the solo, which makes Eldon's dislike for Hunter intensify. Then, in "You're the one that I want" Hunter finally takes Michelle on a date and realises he'd rather be with Emily. Later on in that episode, Hunter is rehearsing his Nationals Solo and admits his feelings to Emily, kissing her. Then Hunter does not get in the Internationals team as he gets beaten by Eldon and moves back to Madison. He does a goodbye dance with Eldon, West and James. Later he video chats with Michelle, and is seen watching The Next Step win at internationals.

Thalia 
Thalia (portrayed by Taveeta Szymanowicz) is a new A-Troupe member in season 2. Thalia is a contemporary dancer from a studio who has won Nationals before. In season 2, Thalia did a duet with Giselle and won Small Group with Amanda and Giselle. In season 3, Thalia develops feelings for Eldon, but cannot date him until he can do 30 pirouettes, according to James. However, after Eldon wins the turning round at Internationals, she finally got to date him, after making friends with a Polish man named Baruk. Just after Eldon and Thalia get together, Bartek's team (Poland) leave Miami, after getting beaten by England due to their five-point advantage (due to Ella's solo) in the mystery song round. In season 4, Thalia leaves to join Bartek's studio in Poland and discover her Polish heritage. Thalia returns in season 6 as the studio head of 'Acronation' (A dance team that is renting out studio 1) and this is the team that Amy decides to join due to her being placed in the second row at The Next Step and not being recognised enough. However at Regionals, The team loses in the head-to-head 10-person dance against The Next Step which means they left empty-handed. Thalia's whereabouts after this are a mystery.

Max 
Max (portrayed by Devon Brown) is a lyrical dancer who is a member of Elite during the first two seasons, along with Shantel, Cierra, Tess and Amanda. He joins A-Troupe in season 3 after beating Richelle in the dance battle for a spot on the Internationals team. Max is friends with West, James and Eldon. At the beginning of season 4, Max leaves The Next Step to pursue university as he feels The Next Step has helped him come out of his shell and is ready to move on to a new chapter.

Cierra 
Cierra (portrayed by Cierra Healey) is a contemporary dancer who spent the first two seasons at Elite with Max, Shantel and Amanda. She is the older sister of Skylar and has to compete against her for a spot on the Internationals team. Cierra makes it to A-Troupe whilst Skylar switches from Elite to B-troupe. During season 3, She develops an argumentative side with her sister Skylar due to Skylar having to wait around all the time for her. Cierra does not make it to the team in season 4 due to her messing up in the auditions and worrying too much about her sister Skylar. When Riley takes over as studio head, she and Amanda expect one of them to be moved into A-Troupe, but Amanda is given the spot, which outrages Cierra's sister Skylar.

Shantel 
Shantel (portrayed by Shantel Angela Vailloo) is a contemporary dancer who is a single player. Her political, ambitious motivations reveal Shantel to be rude and disrespectful, and her perfectionism and unwillingness to compromise make Giselle hostile to her. Shantel challenges Giselle for the dance captain position, and after Michelle chooses Giselle to be dance captain, Shantel storms out and leaves A-Troupe, declaring that she does not want to be on a team that does not recognize her talent.

Noah 
Noah (portrayed by Myles Erlick) is a contemporary dancer who is in J-Troupe in season 2 with Richelle. During season 2 Noah is also a member of a band with James. In season 3 Noah is moved up to A-Troupe with Richelle (until she loses to Max in a battle.) While on A-Troupe, Noah develops a crush on Elite dancer Abi, and when she transfers to The Next Step, he attempts to talk to her more. However, he is unable to explain his feelings and fails to talk to her properly. Despite a rough start, Noah gets to know Abi more at the surprise party for Amanda and they kiss whilst dancing together. In season 4, he auditions and makes it onto A-Troupe again. After Abi presumably moves away, his feelings for Abi fade away. However, during the first qualifier for Regionals he has a severe back injury which causes The Next Step to lose. Noah dates Amanda during this season, but during the Off season they end up breaking up. In season 5, Noah falls in love with Jacquie after meeting her at a dance workshop led by Daniel. However, Jacquie is Henry's ex-girlfriend and Henry is Noah's best friend. After realizing Michelle's troupe is the better of the two, Noah decides to leave TNS East and join TNS West. After the two teams merge again, he becomes dance captain. In season 6, Noah decides to leave The Next Step after Regionals to pursue a professional career.

Piper 
Piper (portrayed by Alexandra Chaves) is a sensible contemporary dancer. Piper is the younger sister of James and one of Deborah's daughters. Piper did not want to come to The Next Step at first because she did not want to dance in James' shadow. After James quit dance to focus on his band, Piper took his place in A-Troupe. James is protective of Piper and believes that she is not ready for A-Troupe. She is dismayed when Riley kisses Alfie and worried about the Jiley relationship but is later relieved when they make up. In season 5, she originally becomes a member of TNS East but when Amy takes her spot, she joins TNS West and becomes the dance captain. She throws a dance-a-thon in which dancers have to dance for 12 hours in order to raise money for a scholarship so that less fortunate dancers can dance at TNS. In season 6, Piper struggles with an 'aerial' and fails to impress Miss Angela when she was studio head. This infuriates Miss Angela so she decides to make everyone do planks until Piper nails her aerial and she also insults her in many ways including at Regionals. Due to this, Piper decides to leave the Next Step without giving any notice to Miss Angela which makes her replace Piper with Winnie (A dancer in B troupe). However, with Miss Angela fired by Ms. Kate, Emily and Michelle help Piper regain her love for dance and she returns to A troupe. During this season, Piper makes a connection with a friendly teammate Finn. They become very close however she does not yet have feelings for him. In the contemporary routine at regionals, Piper fails to do her aerial, causing The Next Step to move from 1st place down to 5th place. Piper gets super worried that her teammates hate her however Finn cheers her up by singing his childhood song in which he sang for a cereal advertisement. Also during Regionals, Miss Angela insults Piper yet again by saying that she cannot even do an aerial, decimating her self-esteem. Piper disappears before A-Troupe perform their final dance and Emily realises that she is missing. Emily then goes and searches for her in all the corridors until she finds her sitting and crying. Emily explains to her that she can do the aerial and her speech motivates Piper. Piper then successfully performs her aerial. In season 7, Piper reveals that she has always liked Finn, but never had the courage to tell him. She realises she is too late and has missed her chance with him as Finn is now in a relationship with her best friend Amy. Regardless of this, Piper decides to tell Finn, and Finn ends up kissing her. Piper feels extremely bad especially as she has had experience of witnessing cheating with catching Riley and Alfie kissing. Piper then tries to avoid Finn and Amy, but she ends up telling Amy of what happened and Amy angrily says that they are no longer best friends. Feeling sad, Piper tries to regain her friendship and Amy eventually forgives her. Piper then finally can reveal to Finn that they can officially become a couple.

Alfie 
Alfie (portrayed by Giuseppe Bausilio) first appears in season 3 as the male soloist for Switzerland at Internationals. He auditions for A-Troupe in season 4 and gets in. It is discovered during season 4 that Alfie is a prince from Switzerland. However, Alfie keeps his identity a secret from the other troupe members to avoid trouble and maintain his ability to dance at the studio. Despite being fully aware about Riley and James' relationship, he develops requited romantic feelings for Riley and they kiss in the season 4 mid-season finale. Piper witnesses their kiss, and acts very hostile towards Alfie, and this drives a greater wedge in their qualifier duet. When James finds about the kiss, Alfie does not feel an ounce of guilt. After Riley breaks up with James, he commences a relationship with her, albeit short-lived. Alfie's relationship with Riley disintegrates whilst dating, and their break-up occurs when Riley reconciles with James at Bangers and Mashups. Alfie leaves the studio due to heartbreak but James eventually convinces him to dance in the finals when A-Troupe do not have enough dancers. After The Next Step loses at regionals, Alfie leaves A-Troupe. Alfie then returns in the Christmas Special of The Next Step which celebrates the 30 year anniversary of the studio.

Sloane 
Sloane (portrayed by Erika Prevost) is a hip-hop dancer who joins A-Troupe in season 4. Her best friend is LaTroy, who later becomes her boyfriend. Sloane struggles to do any other dance styles apart from hip-hop. Sloane gets disqualified at Regionals when she uses choreography in a free-style round. At the start of season 5, Sloane confesses that she has left The Next Step after being offered the opportunity to work with Luther Brown. She returns in season 6 alongside her boyfriend LaTroy as a choreographer for the hip hip routine featuring the boys of A-Troupe.

LaTroy 
LaTroy (portrayed by Akiel Julien) is a hip-hop dancer who joins A-Troupe in season 4. His best friend is Sloane. He is Amy's boyfriend but soon he became Sloane's boyfriend in season 4. After being forbidden to audition for A-Troupe by Emily, he decides to join Michelle's troupe, TNS West. LaTroy then leaves The Next Step in season 5. In season 6, He returns alongside his girlfriend Sloane as a choreographer of the hip hop routine for the girls of A troupe.

Skylar 
Skylar (portrayed by Skylar Healey) is the younger sister of Cierra and a former member of Elite and joins B-Troupe after losing against Cierra in the dance battles to compete for a place on the Internationals team. Skylar auditions for A-Troupe in season 4 and gets in. She does not make it into A-Troupe in season 5, so rather than join B-Troupe she leaves The Next Step. In "Stand Together or Fall Apart", it is later that Skylar became the dance captain at the Gemini Dance Academy.

Cassie 
Cassie (portrayed by Allie Goodbun) is a jazz dancer who joins A-Troupe in season 4. Later in the season Cassie is disappointed when Riley makes her an alternate for the finals routine and regionals. After the drama with Alfie and Michelle, Cassie does end up dancing at in the finals at regional. It is revealed at the start of season 5 that Cassie left The Next Step after regionals.

Amy 
Amy (portrayed by Shelby Bain) is an acro and jazz dancer who joins A-Troupe in season 4. She is also a member of the Zero Percent club. She is LaTroy's girlfriend throughout the fourth season, but he breaks up with her in the season finale after he realizes that he has feelings for Sloane. In season 5, she auditions for A-Troupe but does not make it. Wanting to go to Regionals, Amy decides to join Michelle's troupe, TNS West but is pulled when her mum sees her and realises that she is not on A-Troupe. Piper then asks Emily and Daniel to let Amy audition and Amy replaces Piper on TNS East. In season 6, she leaves The Next Step after being placed in the second row and not being recognised enough on A troupe as a lead dancer. Amy joins Thalia's team 'Acronation' and is offered a solo, front row and centre and being featured in all the regionals dances. She has a rocky relationship with Henry after they nearly kiss, however she develops feelings for Ty (A dancer on AcroNation) and rejects Henry's proposal to prom and decides to go with Ty. Throughout the season, she struggles to cope with her relationship with Henry. At regionals, Amy is not coping with seeing Henry and Summer together, however in the end she is on terms with it. Also at regionals, Amy misses The Next Step a lot and she finds it hard to see them all laughing and having a good time together and she wishes she was dancing on stage with them. AcroNation eventually loses Regionals to The Next Step. Following these events, In season 7, Amy returns to A-Troupe hoping to have a calm season with her friends without any drama about line placements or how good of a dancer she is compared to others. However, Amy's relationship drama continues into season 7. After spending lots of time with Finn, Amy and Finn decide to become a couple, however, after she finds out that he cheated on her with her best friend Piper, she decides to break up with him. Amy then decides to continue her unfinished moment from season 6, with Henry and they both kiss, and decide to have a relationship.

Richelle 
Richelle (portrayed by Briar Nolet) is an acro , ballet, and contemporary dancer who is determined to become dance captain of A-Troupe one day. She has a crush on Noah in season 3. As a J-Troupe Member, Auditions for "The Challenge". After Emily leaves The Next Step because of her knee Kate put Richelle on A-Troupe but lost to Max in the battle and went down to B-Troupe with new member Skylar, Gabi and Shannon. Richelle is then moved to B-troupe, where she befriends Abi, an ex-Elite dancer, and unfortunately, Noah's crush. Richelle first likes Noah in season 3, but she gives up on him. However, at one point in season 3, Phoebe tells the B-troupers to partner up with an A-trouper. Noah and Richelle are put together, and after Richelle sees Noah blow raspberries and gets chocolate spread around his mouth, she strongly dislikes him. In season 4, Richelle joins A-Troupe for the Regionals team but loses dance captaincy to Skylar. In season 5, she becomes dance captain of TNS East, however she developed an injury called snapping hip syndrome and she decided to dance the Regionals qualifier video with this injury and ends up in hospital.

Henry 
Henry (portrayed by Isaiah Peck) is a hip-hop dancer who joins A-Troupe in season 4. He joined to get his mind of Jacquie, his ex-girlfriend who said he was not a good enough dancer. However, he is shocked to see her in season 5 and is even more shocked to see that she is dating his best friend, Noah. Henry auditions for A-Troupe but does not make it so he joins Michelle's troupe, TNS West. He dated Summer in season 6 and they later broke up. In season 7, after he breaks up with Summer and Amy breaks up with Finn, Henry and Amy begin a relationship.

Jacquie 
Jacquie (portrayed by Dylan Ratzlaff) is a contemporary dancer who joins TNS East in season 5. Prior to season 4, she was Henry's girlfriend but she broke up with him because she thought he was not a good enough dancer. She is now dating Noah. They broke up at the end of season 6 because he decided to leave TNS. However, Jacquie also decided to then leave The Next Step before season 7.

Lola 
Lola (portrayed by Jessica Lord) is a jazz dancer who joins TNS East in season 5. Prior to this, she was the dance captain of Encore Dance Studios but left there because she did not have any friends. She arrives at The Next Step in the hope of making friends and instantly becomes best friends with Richelle. She is originally happy to get the solo in a routine being choreographed by Eldon but is then embarrassed when she realises that he mistook Jacquie for her. However, Jacquie comforts Lola and motivates her to work harder. When TNS East and TNS West merge, Lola helps Richelle with her dance captain campaign. When Richelle loses her position, Lola attempts to comfort her, but is antagonized by Richelle, who angrily accuses her of being the reason that she lost. Lola tries to rationalise the situation, leaving Richelle to proclaim she is no longer her friend and storm out of the room. After learning about Richelle's hip injury, she urges Richelle to tell somebody, but is coerced into keeping her injury a secret. When asking Heather advice for what to do, Lola is mistaken for being the injured one. When Richelle refuses to confess, Lola comes to realise that Richelle is being selfish. With no other ways to get through to her, Lola breaks the shank of Richelle's pointe shoe. This results in Lola losing her close friendship to Richelle.

Ozzy 
Ozzy (portrayed by Julian Lombardi) is first seen in the Off season as a member of J-Troupe when he is upset that Amanda quits teaching J-Troupe in order to be part of a famous dance tour but is ecstatic when he realises that Richelle is the new teacher and has an enormous crush on her. In season 5, Emily forbids him from auditioning for A-Troupe so he joins Michelle's troupe, TNS West. He likes pranking others. In season 6, His friendship with Kingston was at risk due to him finding out that Kingston is skipping school and not achieving his grades. Ozzy then has a dance battle with Kingston and are both left enemies. Ozzy then decides to do the right thing by telling Emily and Michelle about Kingston and he is then praised. Ozzy also has brief enemy encounters with his old teammate form B Troupe Heath. Following the events of his friendship with Kingston, They both become best friends again and Ozzy helps Kingston to get back on track with his schoolwork.

Josh 
Josh (portrayed by Dawson Handy) is a hip-hop dancer who joins TNS East in season 5. He used to be a hockey player but joins TNS East when Michelle quits A-Troupe in favour of forming TNS West.

Kingston 
Kingston (portrayed by Noah Zulfikar) arrives at The Next Step upon West's invitation to join TNS West. He is a vlogger on YouTube who learned how to dance from watching online videos. He struggles to learn choreography which causes Michelle to take him off the troupe but his willingness to improve his dancing (as he joins Baby Ballet in order to get some proper training) causes Michelle to let him back onto the team. In season 6, Kingston mysteriously is getting better and stronger in his dancing. His best friend Ozzy then finds out that he has been skipping school for dance rehearsals and lessons. Kingston is then angry at Ozzy for looking through his things and after weeks of pestering by Ozzy, he decides to have a dance battle with him and this dance was to show that from that point they were now enemies. Ozzy then decides to tell Michelle and Emily about Kingston and this sends Kingston into even more rage with Ozzy. After being told by his mum that if his grades do not improve, then he will be kicked out of the studio, all of his teammates (including Ozzy) decide to help him with his schoolwork and Kingston then finally achieves his grades. Kingston then realises that Ozzy did the right thing and they were then best friends again. season 6 marked Kingston's first time competing on a stage. In season 7, Kingston has a romantic interest with an old enemy of A-troupe, Lily.

Zara 
Zara (portrayed by Milaina Robinson) is Jazz Funk dancer who joins TNS East in season 5. She used to be a member of A-Troupe and she befriends Josh. She is also a mathematician but has to choose between math and dance when her math competition is scheduled on the same day as the dance battle against TNS West. She left prior to season 6.

Heather 
Heather (portrayed by Hanna Miller) is first seen in season 4 as a member of Dance Extreme. She performs in the winning trio at the Regionals qualifier. At Regionals, she performs in the freestyle round against Sloane and wins. However, her team lose in the quartet round. During the Off season, Heather becomes a barista at Neutral Grounds and is said to have quit dance after her parents not being able to afford it. She does a flip in Studio A and says that although she can no longer dance, she will always be a dancer. She always dances before Neutral Grounds opens but is embarrassed when Piper and Amy catch her dancing. She dances in Studio A which makes Piper encourage her to audition for TNS West. She is furious to hear about the dance-a-thon as it means that everybody knows about her financial problems, however, when Piper is unable to dance, she takes her place and ends up winning joint 1st place with Henry. After this success, she decides to join TNS West. In season 6, Heather has been accepted a place in college and is unsure on what do. After seeing how the new studio head treats A troupe, she decides to leave as she could be achieving much better things.

Summer 
Summer (portrayed by Sage Linder) is the winner of The Stacy Carpenter Scholarship and a lyrical and contemporary dancer on A-Troupe. During season 6, Summer develops a heated Rivalry with Richelle, Jacquie and a minor rivalry with Amy. This is due to her being placed front row and centre in the regionals dance and Amy, Richelle and Jacquie were not happy about this. After being tricked, insulted and ignored at Summer decides to stay low on the radar with the girls. Summer was then picked as the prom queen alongside Henry as the Prom king. This made Summer and Henry grow closer and eventually, they became a couple. Summer was also picked as the soloist for the absolute dance wild style convention however she lost to Lily from Encore Dance Studio. This made Richelle and Jacquie even more angry at Summer however once given a thorough talk by Michelle they both agreed to stay on the good side with Summer. In season 7, she leaves A-Troupe after they decide to compete in Dancemania, a professional dance competition and feuding with Richelle regarding dance captaincy. She subsequently joins B-Troupe after discovering they will be going to Nationals instead. During this, she also decides to break up with Henry, as Henry decides that it is not working out.

Kenzie 
Kenzie (portrayed by Emmerly Tinglin) is an acro and hip-hop dancer on A-Troupe.  She got in The next step by Miss. Angela, while she joins in season 6.  She was brought by Miss. Angela and Alongside Summer.

Finn 
Finn (portrayed by Liam Mackie) is a hip-hop dancer on A-Troupe. In season 6, he develops a rather friendly relationship with Piper. Finn was the iconic boy featured in the 'Fruity Moons' cereal advert during his childhood and this was revealed to Piper in secret however Piper then revealed this to Michelle and Emily and they revealed it to the rest of A-Troupe. Finn was very unhappy with Piper for revealing this to Emily and Michelle however Piper apologised and Finn forgave her. Finn even decided to sing this in front of the public at Regionals in order to cheer Piper up. In season 7, Finn falls in love with Amy, however, when Piper reveals she still has feelings for him, he cheats on Amy and kisses Piper. Amy then forgives Finn, and Finn can finally be a couple with Piper.

Davis 
Davis (portrayed by Berkeley Ratzlaff) is an acro dancer and Jacquie's older sister, formerly on A-Troupe, and now a part of Encore Dance Studios. In season 6 She is at a convention when Emily and Michelle invite her to join TNS

Cleo 
Cleo (portrayed by Danielle Verayo) is a hip-hop and urban dancer, and a former alternate on A-Troupe. After auditioning for an alternate position on the Nationals team, Cleo makes it onto A-Troupe, and is determined to become a featured dancer. Cleo angrily decides to leave A troupe after she finds out that she is not needed as they are competing in the reality dance TV show Dancemania. She ends up joining B-troupe as her ambition is for her to go to Nationals.
Cleo also has shown a romantic side when she did a duet with Jude (A girl on B-Troupe) and kissed her at the end of the duet

Heath 
Heath (portrayed by Carter Musselman) is a A-Troupe dancer, formerly a B-Troupe dancer. He is shown to have a certain hatred for Ozzy which contributes to their rivalry. In season 7, he auditions for an alternate position on the Nationals team, and Heath makes it into A-Troupe.

Lily 
Lily (portrayed by Katie Ortencio) is Miss Angela's daughter who is the former dance captain of The Next Step for a very short period of time and now dance captain of Encore. Lily betrayed the team by saying that she would bring Piper back if she was dance captain, however what she really did was replace Piper with Winnie. Lily however had no friends at her old studio and she developed (what she thought) was a friendship with Richelle but she did not know that Richelle was using her and pretending to be her friend in order to get rid of her and her mum from The Next Step. When Lily found out, she was furious and threw cake on Richelle's face but Richelle did the same to her and this caused a food fight. Once Ms Angela was fired, She bought Encore dance studios and Lily was now the dance captain. Lily then won the convention allowing her to win a 5-point advantage for regionals. After these events, Lily came back with a proposal for Davis to be featured a spot on encore and Davis decided to leave and join Encore. At regionals, after it was announced that Encore had won, a judge came and consulted to Ms Angela that she stole the choreo and therefore Encore was disqualified. Ms Angela decided to Bribe the judge with money and Lily then overheard. Lily then told Ms Angela to do the right thing. In season 7, Lily returns to the next step in order to have a second chance and redeem herself by auditioning for A troupe and Emily and Nick decide to give her the spot on A troupe. However, other members of A-Troupe are not so convinced that she is telling the truth. They soon believe her and make her feel welcome on the team. Lily then develops a romantic interest in Kingston, and they officially become a couple despite, arguing and breaking up a countless number of times, they still end up being together.

Nick
Nick (portrayed by Myles Dobson) is the new studio owner of The Next Step Dance Studio, after Kate sells the studio. Nick is also, a big fan of Dancemania, the reality TV dance show in which A-troupe compete in season 7. On the later episodes of season seven Nick makes a deal with Emily revealing to the viewers that he is insecure about running the studio by himself. When A-Troupe arrive at DanceMania Emily refuses the offer and says Nick will be able to run the studio by himself. Nick was the only one who was told Emily was leaving the studio although A-Troupe seemed to guess it

Recurring characters

Overview of recurring cast and notable guests

 Notes

Beth
Beth (portrayed by Megan Mackenzie) is one of the B-Troupe dancers. She is James' ex-girlfriend and would not leave him alone, even though James does not  like her back. In "Winner Takes All", she watches James and A-Troupe perform, and before they perform, admits she loves James. She asks him for help a lot in season 2 and they become a couple later on, but James breaks up with her realizing he still has feelings for Riley. Beth soon realises that James does not love her like he loves Riley and she leaves him alone, after giving him a four leaf clover for one of the tasks on Riley's list. In season 3, Beth distracts Stephanie from their duet rehearsal by going to the nail parlour and constantly bringing up shopping. They eventually receive the motivation from dance captain Giselle who makes sure they focus on performing their duet.

Lucien
Lucien (portrayed by Allain Lupien) is the owner and head choreographer of the Elite Dance Academy. He is very rude as well, and makes fun of the fact that Kate owns The Next Step just because Kate's mother (who previously owned it) quit. He also is a schemer and does not like The Next Step ever since they beat Elite at Regionals and wants to beat The Next Step Studio once and for all. In season 2, he gets Amanda to go undercover and pretend to be a member of A-Troupe. Amanda leaves them with 9 dancers. However, this plan backfires as Amanda realises her ways and becomes good. After Nationals, Lucien evicts The Next Step from their studio and would only offer them the studio if The Next Step merged with Elite to make a new team for Internationals. However, this plan backfires but he tries to bring them down one more time during the final round by becoming a judge but he is taken away and evicted immediately. In season 4 We find out that Lucien sold Elite Dance academy after they lost nationals.

Tess
Tess (portrayed by Jamie O'Leary) is Amanda's assistant dance captain at the Elite Dance Academy. She is very loyal to Elite, and Lucien, and is an even bigger schemer than Amanda is. Tess is jealous of Michelle, and appears to also be jealous of Amanda. In the second season, she conspires with Lucien to frame Michelle for shoplifting to try and prevent Michelle from competing against Amanda in the female solos round, and Amanda does not appreciate the lack of confidence in her ability to win, though their scheme fails and Michelle defeats Amanda. Tess and Elite win third place in the small group competition at nationals, though they are defeated by The Next Step's small group who win the category. In season 3, Tess tries to convince Amanda to return to Elite, but fails when Amanda declares she is with The Next Step now. She competes against Amanda for a spot on the internationals team, but despite putting in a good performance, Amanda is deemed the winner, and a crushed Tess runs out of the studio.

Deborah
Deborah (portrayed by Viviana Zarrillo) is James' and Piper's overprotective mother. Deborah has a no nonsense personality. Deborah is concerned about James when his grades slip. Deborah thinks that James has been spending too much time on dance and not enough time on school. Michelle talks Deborah out of taking James out of The Next Step. Deborah reluctantly agrees to let James stay at the studio. She does take James out for two weeks and grounds him until his grades improve. Deborah does not approve of James doing dance and music as she wants him to focus on his education.

Margie
Margie (portrayed by Francesca van Keeken) is a dancer in the "baby ballet" class, and its unofficial leader. She takes a liking to Chloe, and helps Chloe out when she takes over teaching the baby ballet class. Margie even gives Chloe pep talks when needed. Margie is last seen in the third season episode "Do The Right Thing", when she disappears in a glimmer of lights after dancing with Chloe, implying that Margie was simply Chloe's guardian angel from the start.

Luke
Luke (portrayed by Shane Harte) is the lead singer and guitarist of James' band. Luke is also a character on "Lost & Found: Music Studio".

Abi
Abi (portrayed by Abigail Bergman) is a ballet dancer and former student at Elite Dance Academy who transfers to The Next Step in season 3. When Abi arrives at The Next Step, she joins B-Troupe. Noah had a crush on her and at Amanda's welcome back party, she hopes Noah will ask her to dance. After Noah's feelings of nervousness fade away, Abi is asked by him to dance. During this time, Abi kisses and dances with Noah. Despite these reciprocated feelings, it is said Abi has moved away off screen and has never been mentioned since. This is due to her actress Abigail Bergman being fired after running away from home.

John
John (portrayed by Alex Zaichkowski) is a member of Luke's band. He is also a character on "Lost & Found: Music Studio" thus it is revealed on an episode of "Lost & Found: Music Studio" that he has a crush on Next Step dancer Michelle.

Theo
Theo (portrayed by Levi Randell) is a member of Luke's band and Giselle's love interest in season 3. Theo is also a character on "Lost & Found: Music Studios". Theo helps out Amanda when Noah is having his back surgery. Theo is a bit weird and he makes up a lot of codenames, including for Noah and Amanda

Ella
Ella (portrayed by Ella Gilling) is an exchange dancer from the internationals exchange programme during season 3. She is mischievous and comes from Summerford Dance Academy in England. Ella soon befriends Riley, asking Riley why should she wait around for James, and convincing Riley to do something fun in the meantime. She changes Riley's sensible personality to a lively, mischievous personality, and they both pull pranks. One prank is changing the internationals letters from hotel information to an old-fashioned square dance. At first A-troupe is stressed and upset, but by the end of the day, they all lighten up and are happy about it. Ella's main goal for the prank was to stop A-troupe from being too uptight. They also wrap James' bad set in bubble wrap which he finds funny, but after Ella and Riley pull many pranks (including the square dance) he dislikes them, especially Riley. He is annoyed in the square dance prank, as he says it is a waste of his band time. In Ella's last prank, which was to pretend that Riley's back had broken, James knew better and sussed it out. At internationals, Ella betrays The Next Step by stealing Riley's solo routine and performing it herself to "On My Way". Riley ends her friendship with Ella after this. Giselle is forced to perform a solo in Riley's place, dancing to "When The War Is Over". Ella wins, getting the 5-point advantage for her team, and the trophy. The Next Step face England in the semifinals, and their semifinals routine beats England. Ella offers Riley congratulations, but Riley rejects them. Ella appears in season 4 when she comes across James in London, tells James that Riley still loves him. It is then revealed that Riley has reconciled with Ella, and was the one to call Ella to get her to find James and console him.

Elliot
Elliot (portrayed by Julian Elia) is a ballet dancer who joins TNS West in season 5. He is extremely egoistic and thinks that without him, the team will not be successful. When he is paired with Piper in the dance-off against TNS East to decide where the dance battle to go to Regionals will take place, he forces Piper to agree to changing West's choreography which he deems "as bland as a piece of toast". However, after coming clean, Michelle orders him to leave TNS West but he strongly believes that the team is going nowhere without him. He returns in season 6 as Richelle's boyfriend and takes her to prom, only to find out that he got the part of an understudy in a musical. He then decides to break up with Richelle leaving her heartbroken.

Jude
Jude (portrayed by Molly Saunders) is a dancer who auditions for A-Troupe, but due to her dyslexia, she could not learn the choreography on time, so she is given a place on B-Troupe. Jude admits that she has had a crush on Cleo for a long time, however she is unsure if Cleo has the same feelings as her.

Winnie
Winnie (portrayed by Madi Langdon) is a former A-Troupe dancer for a very short period of time and a B troupe dancer. Winnie, joined A-Troupe when Miss Angela was studio head, but was demoted back down to B-Troupe and replaced with Piper after Miss Angela was kicked out of the studio. She was also ecstatic that she had the chance to dance with Ozzy, saying how she now gets the chance to dance with her crush. In season 7, Winnie, auditions for an alternate spot on A-troupe, however, she fails to succeed, so she decides to keep her spot on B-Troupe.

Izzy
Izzy (portrayed by Renee Romolo) is the competitive younger sister of Ozzy who auditions for A-Troupe. She is given a place on B-Troupe after she fails to get the alternate spot on A troupe.

Ty
Ty is a member of Thalia's rival studio in season 6, Acronation. He has a crush on Amy and ends up dating her for a brief period of time.

References

Next Step
Next Step